This is a list of all demo albums recorded by Iowa-based rock group Stone Sour.

1993 Demo

Recorded in Junior's Motel in Otho, Iowa.
Track Listing:
1. Dead Man's Glare
2. Surgery
3. Voices Again
4. Sometimes
5. Turn Your Head
6. I Can't Believe
7. Funky Milk
8. By Your Side
9. Spontaneous Combustion

1994 Demo

Recorded in Big Fish Studios in Omaha, Nebraska.
Track Listing:
1. Surgery
2. That's Ridiculous
3. Sometimes
4. I Can't Believe
5. Tar Poo
6. Funky Milk
7. Simple Woman
8. Bertha
9. Voices Again

1996 Demo

Recorded in SR Audio in Iowa.
Track Listing:
1. Tumult (*)
2. Superskin
3. Monolith (*)
4. Faux Pax
5. Maybe When I Die Then I'll Meet Elvis
6. Take A Number (*)
7. Bedanya
8. September
9. Inherited
10. Things Like Raisins
11. Mother's Ghost

(*): Song was used in Stone Sour (Self-titled album) under original name

2001 Demo

Track Listing:
1. Omega (*)
2. Get Inside (*)
3. Kill Everybody (**)
4. Ending Beginning (***)
5. The Wicked (**)
6. Idle Hands(*)
7. Talk
8. Road Hog (**)
9. Dead Weight (****)
10. Bother (*)
11. All I Know
12. Silent Type
13. Death Dance Of The Frog Fish (*****)

(*): Song was used in Stone Sour (Self-titled album) under original name

(**): Song was used in Stone Sour (Self-titled album) (Special Edition) under original name

(***): Song was used in Audio Secrecy under the name "The Bitter End".

(****): Song was used in Stone Sour (Self-titled album) (Special Edition) under the name "Rules of Evidence"

(*****): A cover of Napoleon XIV's "They're Coming to Take Me Away Ha-Haaa!"

2010 Demo

Recorded at Blackbird Studios in Nashville, Tennessee. Stone Sour is hosting these demos exclusively for their fanclub named Dead Generation on their fansite, with a new demo posted every month. These songs have appeared on Stone Sour's third album Audio Secrecy in 2010.

These demos are posted to allow fans to hear the evolution of their tracks. Some songs have very few changes from the demo version to the final version, such as "Digital," whereas the demo of songs  as "Mrs. Suicide" and "Threadbare," contain many differences compared to the album version.

Note: It is unknown if these demos were actually ever recorded to a disk, so this track listing is actually just in the order that the songs were released to the Dead Generation fanclub online.

Track Listing:
1. Mrs. Suicide (Say You'll Haunt Me Demo)
2. Mission Statement
3. Digital (Did You Tell)
4. Metalheads (The Bitter End Demo)
5. Unfinished
6. Nylon (Nylon 6/6 Demo)
7. Hesitate
8. Threadbare
9. Dying
10. Let's Be Honest
11. Miracles
12. Pieces

2012/2013 Dead Generation Demos

Josh Rand is hand picking never-before-released Stone Sour demos from the band's archives to share with club members. The first one has been posted Friday July 20, and thereafter on the 1st and the 15th of each month. Fan Club members will get first-hand insight of how Stone Sour write as a band and how their music evolves into what you hear on the albums. Some of the tracks will be extremely raw in their beginning stages, while others will sound more polished.

Note: This track listing is only in the order that the songs were released to the Dead Generation fanclub online.

Track Listing:
1. Get Inside (2000 Demo) 3:25
2. Blue Study (2000 Basement Demo) 4:38
3. Ending/Beginning (2000 Project X Demo) 4:18
4. Inside The Cynic (2000 Basement Demo) 3:36
5. Bother (2000 Project X Demo) 3:52
6. Idle Hands (2000 Project X Demo) 3:59
7. Tumult (1996 SR Demo) 3:54
8. Take A Number (1996 SR Demo) 3:47
9. The Wicked (2000 Project X Demo) 5:01
10. Reborn (2005 Instrumental Demo) 3:25
11. Fruitcake (2005 Demo) 4:01
12. They're Coming To Take Me Away (2000 Project X Demo)
13. 30/30-150 (2005 Demo)
14. Drama Cyst (2005 Demo of Come What(ever) May)
15. Hell & Consequences (2005 Demo)
16. Scars (2000 Demo)
17. Your God (2005 Demo)
18. Through Glass (2005 Demo)
19. 1st Person (2005 Demo)
20. Cardiff (2005 Demo)
21. Suffer (2005 Demo)
22. Mission Statement (2007 Instrumental Demo)
23. Used Future ("The Bitter End" 2005 Demo)
24. Freeze Dry Seal (2005 Demo)
25. Nylon (2009 Demo)
26. Unfinished (2009 Demo)

References

External links
Stone Sour Discography

Demo albums
Lists of albums by artist
Stone Sour albums